According to Butt Huyton Quarry railway station opened in 1830 as part of the Liverpool and Manchester Railway, but Holt suggests it was originally known as the "station at the bottom of Whiston Incline" being renamed Huyton Quarry sometime after 1838. Either way it was one of the earliest passenger railway stations in the world. The station closed on 15 September 1958.

In 2014, an electrical switching site was constructed in the vicinity as part of the Manchester - Liverpool (via Earlestown) section of the NW electrification schemes.

References

External links
 Huyton Quarry station at Disused Stations Site

Disused railway stations in the Metropolitan Borough of Knowsley
Former London and North Western Railway stations
Railway stations in Great Britain opened in 1830
Railway stations in Great Britain closed in 1958